Paralomis debodeorum is an extinct species of king crab which lived in New Zealand during the Middle–Late Miocene. It was discovered in the Greta Siltstone on Motunau Beach, North Canterbury, near the mouth of the Motunau River. It is a moderate-sized Paralomis and most closely resembles the extant Paralomis zealandica.

It is the first and only lithodid in the fossil record.

Etymology 
The species name "debodeorum" takes its namesake from amateur fossil collectors John and Ann DeBode.

Notes

References 

King crabs
Miocene crustaceans
Marine crustaceans of New Zealand
Fossils of New Zealand
Fossil taxa described in 1998
Crustaceans described in 1998